Juan Humberto Rois Zúñiga (December 25, 1958 – November 21, 1994, popularly known as Juancho Rois and nicknamed El Conejo (the rabbit) was a Colombian vallenato musician, accordionist, and composer.

He was born on December 25, 1958, in San Juan del Cesar, La Guajira and died on November 21, 1994, in a plane crash in Anzoátegui, Venezuela).

See also
Vallenato Legend Festival
Diomedes Díaz

References

1958 births
1994 deaths
Colombian accordionists
Vallenato musicians
Victims of aviation accidents or incidents in Colombia
Victims of aviation accidents or incidents in 1994